In medicine, rural health or rural medicine is the interdisciplinary study of health and health care delivery in rural environments. The concept of rural health incorporates many fields, including geography, midwifery, nursing, sociology, economics, and telehealth or telemedicine.

Research shows that the healthcare needs of individuals living in rural areas are different from those in urban areas, and rural areas often suffer from a lack of access to healthcare. These differences are the result of geographic, demographic, socioeconomic, workplace, and personal health factors. For example, many rural communities have a large proportion of elderly people and children. With relatively few people of working age (20–50 years of age), such communities have a high dependency ratio. People living in rural areas also tend to have poorer socioeconomic conditions, less education, higher rates of tobacco and alcohol use, and higher mortality rates when compared to their urban counterparts. There are also high rates of poverty among rural dwellers in many parts of the world, and poverty is one of the biggest social determinants of health.

Many countries have made it a priority to increase funding for research on rural health. These efforts have led to the development of several research institutes with rural health mandates, including  the Centre for Rural and Northern Health Research in Canada, Countryside Agency in the United Kingdom, the Institute of Rural Health in Australia, and the New Zealand Institute of Rural Health. These research efforts are designed to help identify the healthcare needs of rural communities and provide policy solutions to ensure those needs are met. The concept of incorporating the needs of rural communities into government services is sometimes referred to as rural proofing.

Definitions
There is no international standard for defining rural areas, and standards may vary even within an individual country. The most commonly used methodologies fall into two main camps: population-based factors and geography-based factors. The methodologies used for identifying rural areas include population size, population density, distance from an urban centre, settlement patterns, labor market influences, and postal codes.

The reported number of individuals living in rural areas can vary greatly depending on which set of standards is applied. Canada's rural population can be identified as anywhere from 22% to 38% of the population. In the United States the variation is greater; between 17% and 63% of the population may be identified as living in rural areas. The lack of consensus makes it difficult to identify the number of individuals who are in need of rural healthcare services.

Life expectancy
Studies show that in many parts of the world life expectancy rates are higher in urban areas than in rural areas. There is some evidence to suggest that the gap may be widening in these countries as economic conditions and health education has improved in urban areas.

In Canada, life expectancy in men ranged from 74 years in the most remote areas to 76.8 years in its urban centers. For women, life expectancy was also lowest in rural areas, with an average of 81.3 years. Those living in rural areas adjacent to urban centers also experience higher life expectancies (with men at 77.4 years and women at 81.5 years). Australian life expectancies ranged from 78 years in major cities to 72 years in remote locations. In China, the life expectancy of females is 73.59 years in urban areas and 72.46 in rural areas. Male life expectancy varies from 69.73 years in urban areas and 58.99 in rural areas.

However, there are countries such as the United Kingdom where life expectancy in rural areas exceeds that of urban areas. Life expectancy there is two years greater for men and one-and-a-half years greater for women in rural areas when compared to urban areas. This may be due, in part, to smaller economic disparities in rural areas as well as an increasing number of well-educated and wealthy individuals moving to rural areas in retirement. This is a significant departure from the rural poverty found in many countries.

Health determinants

Access to healthcare

People in rural areas generally have less access to healthcare than their urban counterparts. Fewer medical practitioners, mental health programs, and healthcare facilities in these areas often mean less preventative care and longer response times in emergencies. The lack of healthcare workers has resulted in unconventional ways of delivering healthcare to rural dwellers, including medical consultations by phone or internet as well as mobile preventative care and treatment programs. There have been increased efforts to attract health professionals to isolated locations, such as increasing the number of medical students from rural areas and improving financial incentives for rural practices.

Canadians living in rural areas and small towns have access to half as many physicians (1 per 1,000 residents) as their urban counterparts. On average, these individuals have to travel five times the distance (an average of ) to access these services. They also have fewer specialized healthcare services such as dentists, dental surgeons, and social workers. One study found ambulance service was available in only 40% of the selected sites, blood and Urine testing services in one third of the sites, and only one of the 19 sites had neonatal services. Nursing service had reduced from 26.3% in 1998 to 21.1% in 2005.

The gap in services is due, in part, to the focus of funding on higher-population areas. In China, only 10% of the rural population had medical insurance in 1993, compared with 50% of urban residents. In the 1990s, only 20% of the government's public health spending went to the rural health system, which served 70% of the Chinese population. In the United States, between 1990 and 2000, 228 rural hospitals closed, leading to a reduction of 8,228 hospital beds. In 2009, patients living in rural areas of the United States were transferred to other facilities for care at a rate three times higher than that of patients in large central metropolitan areas.

Rural areas, especially in Africa, have greater difficulties in recruiting and retaining qualified and skilled professionals in the healthcare field. In recent years, physicians from sub-Saharan Africa have left the continent in droves. The global labor market has prompted more than 30% of physicians trained in this region to migrate to higher-income countries. It is often hard for those in rural communities to travel to clinics and hospitals for care. It is not a common practice to seek alternatives which include traditional and allopathic forms of medicine for healing. In sub-Saharan Africa, urban and more prosperous areas have disproportionately more of the countries' skilled healthcare workers. For example, urban Zambia has 20 times more doctors and over five times more nurses and midwives than the rural areas. In Malawi, 87% of its population lives in rural areas, but 96.6% of doctors are found in urban health facilities. Burkina Faso has one midwife per 8,000 inhabitants in richer zones, and one per nearly 430,000 inhabitants in the poorest zone. In South Africa alone, half of their population lives in rural areas, but only 12% of doctors actually practice there. This is similar to the realities in Ghana. Ghana implemented the Community-based Health Planning and Services (CHPS) program which is designed to deliver to care packages, in addition to providing them with physician care. The initiative has face problems in part due to the uneven distribution of healthcare professionals across all communities. There are community districts that are overstaffed, while others in rural districts are severely understaffed or lack formal clinic setups. One solution has been to develop programs designed to train women to perform home-based health care for patients in Rural Africa. One such program is African Solutions to African Problems (ASAP).

In order to improve health care availability in rural areas it is important to understand patient needs - hospitals need to use their distinct populations to their advantage. "Evaluating and processing patient feedback is important for understanding and solving quality of care issues in hospitals. It is critical for rural communities to understand their demographics in order to target specific care options. By involving patients in the process of identifying community needs and weak areas of service within the hospital, administrators can expect to see specialized patient care oriented feedback.

Working conditions
Rural areas often have fewer job opportunities and higher unemployment rates than urban areas. The professions that are available are often physical in nature, including farming, forestry, fishing, manufacturing, and mining. These occupations are often accompanied by greater health and safety hazards due to the use of complex machinery, exposure to chemicals, working hours, noise pollution, harsher climates, and physical labor. Rural work forces thus report higher rates of life-threatening injuries.

Personal health
Lifestyle and personal health choices also affect the health and expected longevity of individuals in rural areas. People from rural areas report higher rates of smoking, exposure to second-hand smoke, and obesity than those in urban areas. These individuals also lead more sedentary lives according to research conducted by the CDC. Additionally, rural areas often have low rates of fruit and vegetable consumption even where farming is prevalent.

While homicide rates are lower in rural areas, death by injury, suicide, and poisoning are significantly more prevalent.  The Australian Institute of Health and Welfare also reports higher rates of interpersonal violence in rural communities.

Physical environment
In many countries a lack of critical infrastructure and development in rural areas can impair rural health. The physical isolation of some rural communities coupled with the lack of infrastructure makes it increasingly difficult for those that live in these regions to travel to seek care in clinics and hospitals. Insufficient wastewater treatment, lack of paved roads, and exposure to agricultural chemicals have been identified as additional environmental concerns for those living in rural locations. The Australian Institute of Health and Welfare reports lower water quality and increased crowding of households as factors affecting disease control in rural and remote locations.

A Renewed Focus on Rural Health Worldwide

National Systems 
Since the mid-1980s, there has been increased attention on the discrepancies in healthcare outcomes between individuals in rural areas and those in urban areas. Since that time there has been increased funding by governments and non-governmental organizations to research rural health, provide needed medical services, and incorporate the needs of rural areas into governmental healthcare policy. Some countries have started rural proofing programs to ensure that the needs of rural communities, including rural health, are incorporated into national policies.

Research centers (such as the Center for Rural and Northern Health Research at Laurentian University, the Center for Rural Health at the University of North Dakota, and the RUPRI Center) and rural health advocacy groups (such as the National Rural Health Association, National Organization of State Offices of Rural Health, and National Rural Health Alliance) have been developed in several nations to inform and combat rural health issues.

In Canada, many provinces have started to decentralize primary care and move towards a more regional approach. The Local Health Integration Network was established in Ontario in 2007 order to address the needs of the many Ontarians living in rural, northern, and remote areas. The Canadian Institute for Health Information has developed the Rural Health Systems Model to support decision-makers and planners with understanding factors that affect rural health system performance, and the Rural Health Services Decision Guide to support decisions surrounding provision of rural health services. In China, a US $50 million pilot project was approved in 2008 to improve public health in rural areas. China is also planning to introduce a national health care system.

World Health Organization
The World Health Organization (WHO) has done many studies on rural health statistics including, for example, showing that urban heath centers score significantly higher in service readiness than rural health centers, and the population of health workers across India where one can see the comparative numbers of workers in urban vs rural areas. Research studies like these exemplify the major problems needing attention in rural health systems and help lead to more impactful improvement projects.

The WHO also works on evaluation health system improvements and proposing better health system improvements. An article published in March 2017 highlighted the large improvement to be made in the Solomon Islands health system in a plan laid out by the Ministry of Health and Medical Services, supported by the WHO. These large scale changes move to bring health services needed by the rural population "closer to home."

Non-governmental organizations (NGOs) 
Lack of government intervention in failing health systems has led to the need for NGOs to fill the void in many rural health care systems. NGOs create and participate in rural health projects worldwide.

Rural health projects 

Rural health improvement projects worldwide tend to focus on finding solutions to the three basic problems associated with a rural health system. These problems center around communication, transportation of services and goods, and lack of doctors, nurses, and general staff.

Many rural health projects in poor areas that lack access to basic medical help like clinics or doctors use non-traditional methods for providing health care. Approaches like Hesperian Health Guides' book, Where There is No Doctor, and World Hope International's app, mBody Health, have been shown to increase health awareness and provide additional health resources to rural communities.

An evaluation of a community organizing, mother and infant health program called the Sure Start project in rural India showed that community organization around maternal and infant health improvement leads to actual improvement in the health of the mother. The evaluation also showed that these community based programs lead to increased use of health services by the mothers.

In the United States, the Health Resources and Services Administration funds the Rural Hospital Performance Improvement Project to improve the quality of care for hospitals with fewer than 200 beds. Eula Hall founded the Mud Creek Clinic in Grethel, Kentucky, to provide free and reduced-priced healthcare to residents of Appalachia. In Indiana, St. Vincent Health implemented the Rural and Urban Access to Health to enhance access to care for under-served populations, including Hispanic migrant workers. As of December 2012, the program had facilitated more than 78,000 referrals to care and enabled the distribution of US $43.7 million worth of free or reduced-cost prescription drugs. Owing to the challenges of providing rural healthcare services worldwide, the non-profit group [Remote Area Medical] began as an effort to provide care in third-world nations but now provide services primarily in the US.

In 2002, NGOs "provided 40 percent of clinical care needs, 27 percent of hospital beds and 35 percent of outpatient services" for people in Ghana. The conditions of the Ghanaian Healthcare system was dire during the early 80s, due to a lack of supplies and trained healthcare professionals. Structural adjustment policies caused the cost of health services to rise significantly. NGOs, like Oxfam, are rebalancing the brain drain that remaining healthcare professionals feel, as well as provide human capital to provide necessary health services to the Ghanaian people.

In Ecuador, organizations such as Child Family Health Organization (CFHI) promote the implementation of medical pluralism by furthering the knowledge of traditional medicine as practiced by Indigenous peoples in a westernizing country. Medical pluralism arises as a deliberate approach to resolving the tension between urban and rural health and is manifested in the practice of integrative medicine. There are currently ongoing efforts to implement this system regionally, more particularly in the nation of Ecuador. It accomplishes the mission of raising awareness for more adequate healthcare systems by immersing participants (including health care practitioners and student volunteers) in programs, both in-person and virtually, that are rooted in community involvement and provide glimpses into the healthcare systems present in vastly distinct areas of the nation. Research examines the role of NGOs in facilitating spaces or "arenas" for spotlighting the importance of traditional medicine and medical pluralism; such "arenas" facilitate a necessary medical dialogue about healthcare and provides a space to hear the voices of marginalized communities. CFHI's efforts are supporting Ecuador's implementation of an integrated system that includes alternative medicine. The process of doing so is, however, challenged by four main obstacles. These four obstacles include "organizational culture", "financial viability", "patient experience and physical space" and, lastly, "credentialing". The obstacles continue to challenge the ongoing work of CFHI and other NGO's as they aim to establish a healthcare system that represents the ethnic diversity of the nation.

In Peru, the presence of certain key organizations such as USAID, PIH, and UNICEF as well as more local NGOs have greatly spearheaded the efforts of establishing a system suitable for the diverse populations of the country. As governments continue to function under the assumption that communities have access to the same resources and live under the same conditions and sets of exposures, their support of Westernized modes of healthcare are inadequate at meeting the varying needs communities and individuals. These systems overgeneralize the needs of the populations and perpetuate harmful cycles by believing that medical practices and procedures can apply to anyone regardless of their environment, socioeconomic status, and color of their skin, when reality proves otherwise. Such systemic failures contribute to a reliance on external NGOs to promote a more equitable healthcare system.

In Bolivia, the Consejo de Salud Rural Andino has been recognized as a pioneering organization improving healthcare for rural communities.

Telemedicine and rural health
For residents of rural areas, the lengthy travel time and distance to larger, more developed urban and metropolitan health centers present significant restrictions on access to essential healthcare services.  Telemedicine has been suggested as a way of overcoming transportation barriers for patients and health care providers in rural and geographically isolated areas. Telemedicine uses electronic information and telecommunication technologies such as video calls to support long-distance healthcare and clinical relationships. Telemedicine provides clinical, educational, and administrative benefits for rural areas that have access to these technological outlets.

Telemedicine eases the burden of clinical services by the utilization of electronic technology in the direct interaction between health care providers, such as primary and specialist health providers, nurses, and technologists, and patients in the diagnosis, treatment, and management of diseases and illnesses.  For example, if a rural hospital does not have a physician on duty, they may be able to use telemedicine systems to get help from a physician in another location during a medical emergency.

The advantage of telemedicine on educational services includes the delivery of healthcare related lectures and workshops through video and teleconferencing, practical simulations, and webcasting.  In rural communities, medical professionals may utilize pre-recorded lectures for medical or healthcare students at remote sites. Also, healthcare practitioners in urban and metropolitan areas may utilize teleconferences and diagnostic simulations to assist understaffed healthcare centers in rural communities in diagnosing and treating patients from a distance. In a study of rural Queensland health systems, more developed urban health centers used video conferencing to educate rural physicians on treatment and diagnostic advancements for breast and prostate cancer, as well as various skin disorders, such as eczema and chronic irritations.

Telemedicine may offer administrative benefits to rural areas. Not only does telemedicine aid in the collaboration among health providers with regard to the utilization of electronic medical records, but telemedicine may offer benefits for interviewing medical professionals in remote areas for position vacancies and the transmission of necessary operation-related information between rural health systems and larger, more developed healthcare systems.

The Coronavirus

Economics 
The coronavirus impacted everyone. However most of the data that was presented or shared on the news was taken from urban locations. Rural areas however were greatly affected as well. When it comes to the new normal that we will all have to live, the rules and regulations mights not work with these communities. Financially these areas were already struggling. Their income relies heavily on farming and agriculture. When the pandemic hit and it became a requirement for all nonessential workers to stay home, this impacted their lives in a different way. Agriculture is an essential job and we needed these communities to continue working. However as the pandemic continued, prices began to drop and even those who were still working were struggling to make ends meet. 
Places outside of the US struggled economically as well. In a study done in Italy, they found that the individuals in the rural areas were less likely to be exposed to the virus because of the smaller population sizes. In these areas the residents live far away from one another. Their social interactions were already limited before the pandemic began. The study indicated that taking advantage of the distance can help reduce the spread. Spending time and money to revitalize rural areas can help form a more sustainable model of better using local resources to help aid in any future incidences.

Health Protocols 
The individuals living in the rural communities are also less likely to follow prevention behaviors that were recommended. Compared to the 84.55% of urban residents who wore masks, only 73.65% of rural residents did. Wearing masks weren’t the only preventative measures that rural residents didn’t do as often. They also were less likely to sanitize their living spaces, social distance, and work from home </ref>. Once the COVID-19 vaccine was created, the individuals in rural communities were hesitant to get them. Already, rural residents were less likely to get vaccines than those in urban areas. A survey done by the CDC in 2018 showed that rural residents were 18% less likely to get the HPV vaccine and 20% less likely to get the Meningococcal conjugate vaccine than urban residents

Health Care 
The health care in general in rural areas has always been struggling. The lack of health care providers has made it difficult for residents to get the care that they might need without going to the big city. With the COVID-19 outbreak, more medical professionals were needed and more equipments and regulations were required. Rural communities have a higher percentage of an older population and they are more susceptible to the virus. Finding ways and people to care for them when they got sick became even more difficult. Rural communities also tend to have a lower rates of health literacy. Health literacy is “...an individuals’ ability to access health information, to understand it, and to apply it in ways that promote good health. This makes it harder to protect individuals when they can’t effectively communicate with their health care providers.

See also 
 Rural and Isolated Practice Registered Nurses
 Rural Health Care in Australia
 Rurality
Medical deserts in the United States
Community health

References

Further reading

External links 
 Office of Rural Health Policy – United States Department of Health and Human Services
 National Rural Health Association
 National Organization of State Offices of Rural Health
 Rural Wisconsin Health Cooperative
 Rural Health Information Hub
 New Zealand Rural General Practice Network  - New Zealand

Determinants of health
Rural culture
Medical specialties